This is a list of all the United States Supreme Court cases from volume 341 of the United States Reports:

References

External links

1951 in United States case law